The Military Mission for Indonesia  was a military training and advice program for the Indonesian Military (TNI) by the Dutch military personnel (KL) it lasted from 1950-1954.

Background
At the Round Table Conference (RTC) of November 2, 1949, it was agreed that with effect from the transfer of sovereignty on December 27, 1949, a Dutch Military Mission (NMM) would be active in Indonesia to provide military-technical and organizational assistance and assistance with the building and training of the Indonesian armed forces. At the first ministerial conference of the Dutch-Indonesian Union (March 1950) a working basis was laid for the establishment of a Provisional Dutch Military Mission. The mission would consist of personnel from the Dutch naval, land, and air forces and should not exceed the total strength of 800 people.

In mid-June 1950, the provisional mission from the Dutch command of the military forces was "divested", giving it independent status with the power to contact the relevant Indonesian authorities directly. As a result, the Headquarters of the Provisional Dutch Military Mission (HK-VNMM) was established with effect from 25 June 1950, which included the Cabinet and the Internal Mission Affairs Department. The Head Office of the Air Force Department (HK-MLU) was also established.

The provisional mission had to start its task with a limited occupation because the implementation of the military sections of the RTC agreement had not yet been completed and the personnel assigned to the mission could only gradually become available as parts, staffs, and services of the Dutch army forces were lifted.

Initially, the aim was to recruit on a voluntary basis. However, the enthusiasm turned out not to be large, mainly because no service conditions were known yet. In order to at least have a core occupation for the head office, the army, and the air force sector, they were then forced to designate them for the duration of the provisional mission.

As more information about the mission became known, so did the interest. However, recruitment in Indonesia did not yield enough candidates. Due to the military-political difficulties encountered during the implementation of the RTC agreement, the composition of the provisional mission strongly urged the replacement of KNIL personnel as soon as possible by the deployment of personnel from abroad. The Netherlands. Since the cooperation and mutual understanding between the mission members and the Indonesian soldiers developed favorably, the initial distrust of the Indonesian supreme command towards the former KNIL soldiers has faded into the background. At the second ministerial conference of the Dutch-Indonesian Union (November 29, 1950) the final mission was established by joint decision.

Agreement
Article 1 of the agreement describes the task of the Dutch Military Mission in Indonesia:

Assisting the Government of the Republic of Indonesia in building and training the armed forces of the Republic of Indonesia;
Advising on issues of a military organizational and technical nature;
Moreover, in the maritime field:
provide assistance in clearing up existing minefields and performing other activities to be determined in mutual consultation;
Moreover, in the field of military aviation:
provide assistance with air traffic control at airports to be determined by mutual agreement and other activities to be determined by mutual agreement.

The agreement was entered into for a period of three years, starting from January 1, 1951.

At the end of 1950 the first additional forces arrived from the Netherlands and the Naval Division entered the official formation of the mission. With that, the organization composition finally came to fruition, namely:

Headquarters, Naval Division, Land Forces Division and Air Force Division.

End of mission
The departments consisted of advisory and instruction groups and teams for the various weapons and service subjects and were stationed in various locations. Negotiations for the renewal or termination of the mission agreement began in the first quarter of 1953. The result of these negotiations was that the mission agreement was not extended. This was recorded in a protocol with appendices, signed by both governments on April 21, 1953.

The last Dutch soldiers left Indonesia in 1954. four years after independence.

References

Military operations involving the Netherlands
Military operations involving Indonesia